Herbert Sisson  (born 1862) was a Welsh international footballer. He was part of the Wales national football team between 1885 and 1886, playing 3 matches and scoring 4 goals. He played his first match on 11  April 1885 against Ireland as part of the 1885 British Home Championship. He scored a hat-trick of 3 goals and Wales won the match by 8–2. He played his last match for Wales on 10 April 1886 against Scotland.

See also
 List of Wales international footballers (alphabetical)
 List of Wales national football team hat-tricks

References

External links

1862 births
1891 deaths
Welsh footballers
Wales international footballers
Wrexham A.F.C. players
Place of birth missing
Association football forwards